Resticula is a genus of rotifers belonging to the family Notommatidae.

The genus has almost cosmopolitan distribution.

Species:
 Resticula anceps Harring & Myers, 1924 
 Resticula gelida (Harring & Myers, 1922)

References

Ploima
Rotifer genera